aka Tora-san, Bluebird of Happiness is a 1986 Japanese comedy film directed by Yoji Yamada. It stars Kiyoshi Atsumi as Torajirō Kuruma (Tora-san), and Etsuko Shihomi as his love interest or "Madonna". Tora-san's Bluebird Fantasy is the thirty-seventh entry in the popular, long-running Otoko wa Tsurai yo series.

Synopsis
During his travels, Tora-san comes across a traditional theater he used to visit, and discovers that one of his old friends has died. Tora-san and his family help the friend's daughter, who becomes romantically involved with an aspiring artist.

Cast
 Kiyoshi Atsumi as Torajirō
 Chieko Baisho as Sakura
 Etsuko Shihomi as Miho Shimazaki
 Tsuyoshi Nagabuchi as Kengo Kurata
 Shimojo Masami as Kuruma Tatsuzō
 Chieko Misaki as Tsune Kuruma (Torajiro's aunt)
 Gin Maeda as Hiroshi Suwa
 Hidetaka Yoshioka as Mitsuo Suwa
 Hisao Dazai as Boss (Umetarō Katsura)
 Gajirō Satō as Genkō
 Chishū Ryū as Gozen-sama
 Jun Miho as Akemi
 Issei Ogata

Critical appraisal
Stuart Galbraith IV judges this to be one of the weaker entries in the Otoko wa Tsurai yo series, but still recommended. Perhaps the most notable aspect of the film is that the co-star, Etsuko Shihomi, was the star of the Sister Street Fighter series. It was on the set of Tora-san's Bluebird Fantasy that she met Tsuyoshi Nagabuchi, whom she married the following year. The German-language site molodezhnaja gives Tora-san's Bluebird Fantasy three and a half out of five stars.

Availability
Tora-san's Bluebird Fantasy was released theatrically on December 20, 1986. In Japan, the film was released on videotape in 1988 and 1996, and in DVD format in 2005 and 2008.

References

Bibliography

English

German

Japanese

External links
 Tora-san's Bluebird Fantasy at www.tora-san.jp (official site)

1986 films
Films directed by Yoji Yamada
1986 comedy films
1980s Japanese-language films
Otoko wa Tsurai yo films
Japanese sequel films
Shochiku films
Films with screenplays by Yôji Yamada
1980s Japanese films